Senator Vance may refer to:

Elijah Vance (1801–1871), Ohio State Senate
J. D. Vance (born 1984), U.S. Senator from Ohio
Joseph Vance (Ohio politician) (1786–1852), Ohio State Senate
Pat Vance (born 1936), Pennsylvania State Senate
William R. Vance (1806–1885), Kentucky State Senate
William Washington Vance (1849–1900), Louisiana State Senate
Zebulon Baird Vance (1830–1894), U.S. Senator from North Carolina